UAB Panevėžio autobusų parkas provides passenger transport services and bus services in the city, suburbs and long-distance routes. The company serves the public transport system in Panevėžys.

History 
Panevėžio autobusų parkas was founded in 1958, as a motor carrier with 59 buses, 10 passenger and 4 freight cars.
In 1995 this company was registered as a closed joint-stock company.

Public transport in Panevėžys

Routes

UAB Panevėžio autobusų parkas is serving 15 Panevėžys city routes with 44 buses running. Total urban route network consists of 136,8 kilometers. There are 223 passenger bus stops.

{| class="wikitable"
|-
! No.
! Route
! Notes
|-
|1
|Aguonų str. - Kniaudiškių str. - Savitiškio str.  
|Workdays only
|-
|3
|Aguonų str. - Projektuotojų str. - Savitiškio str.  
|
|-
|4
|Molainiai - Vaivadai
|
|-
|5
|Parko str. - Venslaviškiai
|Workdays only
|-
|6
|Pajuostis - J. Janionio str.
|on weekends/holidays Pajuostis - Įmonių str.
|-
|7
|Velžys road - AB "Gilėnai"
|on weekends/holidays Velžys road - AB "Panevėžio stiklas"
|-
|8
|Taikos al. - Rožių str.
|
|-
|10
|S.Dariaus ir S.Girėno str. – Tinklų str.
|
|-
|11
|Velžys road – Car service and technical examination centre 
|Workdays only
|-
|13
|Velžys road – "Babilonas"
|
|-
|14
|Savitiškio str. - Tinklų str.
|Workdays only
|-
|15
|S.Dariaus ir S.Girėno str. - Piniava
|
|-
|16
|Wholesale base - Molainių str.
|}

  City bus schedules in English

Ticket Prices
In Panevėžys, as well as in Klaipėda or Kėdainiai, passengers are picked up only through the front door.

{| class="wikitable"
|-
!
! in Kiosk
! in Bus
|-
|50% discount 
|0,75 Lt
|0,90 Lt
|-
|Full price
|1,50 Lt
|1, 80 Lt
|-
|80% discount
|0,30 Lt
|0,36 Lt
|-
|Ticket for whole month
|80,00 Lt
|-
|Ticket for month (work days only)
|56,00 Lt
|-
|Ticket for month with 50% discount
|40,00 Lt
|-
|Ticket for month with 80% discount
|16,00 Lt
|-
|Ticket for half of month full price
|28,00 Lt 
|-
|Ticket for half of month with 50% discount
|20,00 Lt 
|}

External links
 "Panevėžio autobusų parkas" official website
 Panevėžis bus traffic schedule (in English)

Transport in Panevėžys
Bus transport in Lithuania